Flaten may refer to:

Places

Norway
Flaten, Norway, a village in the municipality of Åmli in Aust-Agder county, Norway
Flaten Station, a railway station in the village of Flaten in Åmli municipality, Aust-Agder county, Norway

Sweden
Flaten, a lake in Stockholm, Sweden
Flaten (district), a district in Stockholm, Sweden

People
Bertel Flaten (1900–1963), a Norwegian politician for the Liberal Party
Ingebrigt Håker Flaten (born 1971), a Norwegian jazz musician and bassist
Torgunn Flaten, a Norwegian singer/songwriter